Kokhanok Airport  is a state-owned public-use airport located two nautical miles (3.7 km) southwest of the central business district of Kokhanok, in the Lake and Peninsula Borough of the U.S. state of Alaska.

As per Federal Aviation Administration records, the airport had 1,166 passenger boardings (enplanements) in calendar year 2008, a decrease of 33.9% from the 1,765 enplanements in 2007. This airport is included in the FAA's National Plan of Integrated Airport Systems for 2009–2013, which categorizes it as a general aviation facility.

Facilities 
It has one runway designated 6/24 with a gravel surface measuring 3,300 by 75 feet (1,006 x 23 m).

Airlines and destinations

References

External links 
 FAA Alaska airport diagram (GIF)
 

Airports in Lake and Peninsula Borough, Alaska